William Wellman Jr. (born January 20, 1937) is an American former actor. In a career spanning 65 years, he appeared in about 77 films and television series.

Life and career
Wellman was born in Los Angeles, California, and is the son of actress Dorothy Wellman (née Coonan) and director William A. Wellman, about whose life and career he has talked in a number of interviews. His sister is actress Cissy Wellman.

Wellman played the main character, David Michaels, in Image of the Best and The Prodigal Planet, the last two movies in the Christian end times film series A Thief in the Night. He co-wrote The Prodigal Planet. He also starred in Brother Enemy, which was produced by Mark IV Pictures, the same company that produced the Thief movies.

He played the beatnik biker, Child, in the first Billy Jack (Tom Laughlin) movie The Born Losers and then other characters in follow-up Billy Jack movies, The Trial of Billy Jack and The Return of Billy Jack.

Wellman appeared in the Fred Williamson blaxploitation film Black Caesar and its sequel Hell Up in Harlem, as a character named Alfred Coleman. Both films were directed by Larry Cohen, who also cast him in It's Alive.

In 1959, he appeared in the TV Western Gunsmoke as “Roy” and again in 1962 as “Pvt. King”. Wellman appeared in a Chrysler sales training film in the 1970s. He also had a role in Star Trek: Of Gods and Men (2007 three-part, unofficial miniseries) as Charlie Evans (as William Wellman).

Partial filmography

 Darby's Rangers (1958)
 Lafayette Escadrille (1958)
 Macumba Love (1960)
 The Errand Boy (1961)
 A Swingin Summer (1965)
 Winter A-Go-Go (1965)
 The Born Losers (1967)
 Hook, Line & Sinker (1969)
 Adam-12:
 Season 5 Episode 9, "The Surprise", as Officer Snyder (first aired 11-15-1972)
 Season 5 Episode 15, "Clear with a Civilian", as Officer Snyder (first aired 1-17-1973)
 It's Alive (1974)
 Image of the Beast (1980)
 The Prodigal Planet (1983)
 ''Star Trek: Of Gods and Men (2006)

References

External links
 
 https://www.youtube.com/watch?v=0Da0XOOwAqo

American male film actors
1937 births
Living people
20th-century American male actors
Male actors from Los Angeles